Erebia epipsodea, the common alpine, is a butterfly species of the subfamily Satyrinae of family Nymphalidae. It is found in North America from Alaska south through the Rocky Mountains to northern New Mexico and east across the prairie provinces to southwest Manitoba.

The wingspan is 34–45 mm. Adults are on wing from mid-June to early August.

The larvae feed on various grass species.

Subspecies 
Listed alphabetically:

E. e. epipsodea Butler, 1868 – eastern British Columbia and western Alberta
E. e. freemani Ehrlich, 1954 – eastern Alberta to Manitoba
E. e. hopfingeri Ehrlich, 1954
E. e. remingtoni Ehrlich, 1952 – northern British Columbia and Yukon
E. e. rhodia Edwards, 1871 – Colorado

Similar species
Vidler's alpine (E. vidleri)

References

External links 

 Butterflies and Moths of North America

Erebia
Butterflies described in 1868
Butterflies of North America
Taxa named by Arthur Gardiner Butler